Complètement fou (Remix) is an extended play (EP) by French electropop group Yelle, released through Kemosabe Records on July 24, 2015.

Complètement fou (Remix) contains five remixes of songs from Yelle's third studio album, Complètement fou, released in 2014; an Alexaert remix of "Moteur Action", Sophie and A. G. Cook remix of "Moteur Action", Kool Kojak remix of "Ba$$in", 20Syl remix of "Complètement fou" and a Tepr remix of "Complètement fou".

Track listing

References

External links
 Yelle official site

2015 EPs
2015 remix albums
Yelle albums